Uto Peninsula is a peninsula in the central part of Kumamoto Prefecture in Japan. The length of the peninsula is about 18km.

References 

Peninsulas of Japan
Landforms of Kumamoto Prefecture